Prong was an iPhone battery case company based in New York City, primarily manufacturing accessories for electronic devices.

History
Prong was founded in 2011 with the production of the PocketPlug. The company later introduced the Prong PWR Case, a removable battery case with integrated prongs.

Prong introduced the PocketPlug, at the Consumer Electronics Show in January 2013. It was first reviewed by The Washington Post,  citing that they enjoyed the product, although adding the critique that a battery pack was needed and the product had limited usability during charging. The New York Times gave a similar review. CNet felt that the phone was lacking an external battery.

Prong ceased trading in 2017.

References

External links
 Official Prong website

Battery manufacturers
Electronics companies of the United States
Telecommunications equipment vendors
Manufacturing companies based in New York (state)
Electronics companies established in 2011